Lars Lone is an American politician and a Republican member of the Wyoming House of Representatives representing District 12 since August 30, 2016.

Personal life

2020 
On June 23, 2020, a dog, Remington, escaped from his enclosure. Daisy Parkins, one of the dog's owners, was searching for him as it was their young son's birthday and this dog was his favorite. The dog had wandered onto Lone's property and was standing outside Lone's goat pen barking at his dairy goats. Parkins was driving around the neighborhood and waved at Lone as he was arriving home. A short time later, Lone noticed the dog barking at his goats and shot and killed the dog. Afterward, he assembled a party of four other men and went to the Parkins' house to tell the owners that he had shot their dog for barking at his goats. To conclude the meeting with Parkins, Lone winked at her.

Elections

2016
When incumbent Republican Representative Harlan Edmonds announced his retirement, Lone declared his candidacy. He defeated Clarence Styvar in the Republican primary.  Edmonds then announced he would resign in order to move out of the district.  Laramie County Commissioners appointed Lone to fill the remainder of Edmonds' term. He was sworn in August 30, 2016.

Lone faced former Democratic Representative Lee Filer in the general election and defeated Filer with 53.6% of the vote.

2018
Lone declined to run for reelection, and resigned early after having moved outside the district.

References

External links
Official page at the Wyoming Legislature
Profile from Ballotpedia

Living people
Republican Party members of the Wyoming House of Representatives
Politicians from Cheyenne, Wyoming
21st-century American politicians
Year of birth missing (living people)